Bonsall is a census-designated place (CDP) in San Diego County, California. The population was 3,982 at the 2010 census, up from 3,401 at the 2000 census.

The Bonsall area was heavily affected by the Lilac Fire in December 2017, which burned 4,100 acres.

Name
The area known as Bonsall was originally called Mount Fairview and had a post office by that name from December 28, 1871 to December 28, 1880. It received a post office in 1881 under the name Osgood, after California Southern Railroad chief engineer Joseph O. Osgood; the renaming was supposedly an unsuccessful attempt to convince Osgood to build the railroad through the San Luis Rey River Valley (the rail line eventually followed the Santa Margarita River instead). Following a contest, the town was renamed Bonsall in 1890, after local minister James A. Bonsall.

Geography
Bonsall is just east of Oceanside and Camp Pendleton, north of Vista and northwest of Hidden Meadows.

The  is land whereas  or (1.28%) is water.

Demographics

2010
At the 2010 census Bonsall had a population of 3,982. The racial makeup of Bonsall was 3,194 (80.2%) White, 67 (1.7%) African American, 28 (0.7%) Native American, 138 (3.5%) Asian, 10 (0.3%) Pacific Islander, 376 (9.4%) from other races, and 169 (4.2%) from two or more races. Hispanic or Latino of any race were 893 people (22.4%).

The census reported that 3,967 people (99.6% of the population) lived in households, 15 (0.4%) lived in non-institutionalized group quarters, and no one was institutionalized.

There were 1,542 households, 451 (29.2%) had children under the age of 18 living in them, 873 (56.6%) were opposite-sex married couples living together, 150 (9.7%) had a female householder with no husband present, 62 (4.0%) had a male householder with no wife present.  There were 93 (6.0%) unmarried opposite-sex partnerships, and 12 (0.8%) same-sex married couples or partnerships. 337 households (21.9%) were one person and 109 (7.1%) had someone living alone who was 65 or older. The average household size was 2.57.  There were 1,085 families (70.4% of households); the average family size was 2.99.

The age distribution was 844 people (21.2%) under the age of 18, 278 people (7.0%) aged 18 to 24, 913 people (22.9%) aged 25 to 44, 1,262 people (31.7%) aged 45 to 64, and 685 people (17.2%) who were 65 or older.  The median age was 44.1 years. For every 100 females, there were 96.7 males.  For every 100 females age 18 and over, there were 98.6 males.

There were 1,683 housing units at an average density of 124.0 per square mile, of the occupied units 1,112 (72.1%) were owner-occupied and 430 (27.9%) were rented. The homeowner vacancy rate was 2.6%; the rental vacancy rate was 4.2%.  2,815 people (70.7% of the population) lived in owner-occupied housing units and 1,152 people (28.9%) lived in rental housing units.

2000
At the 2000 census there were 3,401 people, 1,285 households, and 947 families in the CDP. The population density was 252.4 inhabitants per square mile (97.5/km2). The racial makeup of the CDP was 84.00% White, 0.85% African American, 0.38% Native American, 2.76% Asian, 0.12% Pacific Islander, 9.73% from other races, and 2.15% from two or more races. Hispanic or Latino of any race were 21.43%.

Of the 1,285 households 28.3% had children under the age of 18 living with them, 62.6% were married couples living together, 8.1% had a female householder with no husband present, and 26.3% were non-families. 19.8% of households were one person and 7.5% were one person aged 65 or older.  The average household size was 2.65 and the average family size was 3.02.

The age distribution was 23.2% under the age of 18, 7.1% from 18 to 24, 26.1% from 25 to 44, 27.1% from 45 to 64, and 16.5% 65 or older.  The median age was 41 years. For every 100 females, there were 99.6 males.  For every 100 females age 18 and over, there were 100.7 males.

The median household income was $60,625 and the median family income  was $61,761. Males had a median income of $43,250 versus $29,688 for females. The per capita income for the CDP was $35,942.  About 6.5% of families and 6.5% of the population were below the poverty line, including 7.4% of those under age 18 and 6.0% of those age 65 or over.

Education
Bonsall is served by the Bonsall Unified School District consisting of three elementary schools, a middle school, and a high school.

Politics

In June 1988, Bonsall-area voters defeated a ballot initiative to create a Community Services District ("CSD") after opponents argued that the boundaries included too many county taxpayers who more closely associated with neighboring cities Vista and Fallbrook rather than the unincorporated Bonsall community.

References

Census-designated places in San Diego County, California
North County (San Diego County)
Census-designated places in California